The Grand Prix de Wallonie is an annual road bicycle race held annually in Wallonia, Belgium. Since 2005, the race has been organised as a 1.1 event on the UCI Europe Tour. It has a profile similar to the Ardennes classics in Wallonia.

Winners

External links
 

UCI Europe Tour races
Cycle races in Belgium
Recurring sporting events established in 1935
1935 establishments in Belgium